Carin Leslie Jennings-Gabarra (born January 9, 1965) is an American retired soccer forward.  She earned 117 caps with the United States women's national soccer team from 1987 to 1996 and was awarded the Golden Ball Award as the best player at the 1991 FIFA Women's World Cup. In 2000, she was inducted into the National Soccer Hall of Fame. She currently coaches women's soccer at the United States Naval Academy.

Early life and education 
While born in East Orange, New Jersey, Jennings-Gabarra grew up in Rancho Palos Verdes, California, where she attended Palos Verdes High School from 1980 to 1983.  During her four seasons playing high school soccer, she scored 226 goals and was a four-time High School All-American and a three-time California Most Valuable Player.

After high school, Jennings-Gabarra attended the University of California, Santa Barbara where she played on the UC Santa Barbara Gauchos women's soccer team from 1983 through 1986.  In 1984, Jennings-Gabarra set the NCAA Division I women's soccer single-season records for goals (34), goals per game (1.55), points (80), and points per game (3.64).

She finished her college career holding numerous NCAA Division I women's soccer records including 102 goals scored, 1.29 goals per game, 60 assists, 0.76 assists per game, 264 points, and 3.34 points per game.

She was named as a second-team All-American in 1984 and 1985 and a third-team All-American in 1987.   She graduated from UCSB in 1987 with a bachelor’s degree in business management.  Gabarra was named the school’s Athlete of the Decade and in 1991 the university inducted Gabarra into its Hall of Fame.

In 2000, Soccer America selected Jennings-Gabarra to its College Team of the Century.

Playing career

Club 
Jennings-Gabarra played with The Los Angeles Blues (now the Southern California Blues) and later with Southern California Ajax of Manhattan Beach, California.  In 1992 and 1993, Ajax won the USASA National Amateur Cup.
Jennings and defender Joy Biefeld-Fawcett both were members of the Manhattan Beach club women's soccer team Ajax in the late 1980s and early 1990s and routinely played at Columbia Park in Torrance, California. In 1991, Ajax won the U.S. women's amateur championship.

In 1993, Los Angeles United of the Continental Indoor Soccer League drafted Jennings-Gabarra.

International 
Jennings-Gabarra’s fame rests on her achievements with the United States women's national soccer team.  During her ten-year career, spanning 1987 to 1996, she earned 117 caps and scored 53 goals.

1991 World Cup 
During the early 1990s, Jennings-Gabarra was part of the national team's "Triple-Edged Sword".  The term, coined by the Chinese media during the 1991 FIFA Women's World Cup, included two other prolific scorers, April Heinrichs and Michelle Akers.  Of those three players, Akers scored ten goals at the World Cup to claim the Golden Boot, while Jennings-Gabarra added six as the tournament's second leading scorer. Jennings helped the U.S. national team win the first women's World Cup. She was also selected as the Golden Ball Award winner as the tournament’s top player.

1995 World Cup 
In 1995, Jennings-Gabarra and her teammates came up short in the 1995 FIFA Women's World Cup, losing to Norway in the semifinals. Gabarra with her team finished third in Sweden 1995, with a 2–0 win over China in the third-place playoff match.

1996 Olympics 
In 1996, the U.S. won the first women’s Olympic soccer tournament.  Following the tournament, she retired from playing international soccer.

Matches and goals scored at World Cup and Olympic tournaments
Carin Jennings-Gabarra competed in Atlanta 1996 Olympics, China 1991 and Sweden 1995 FIFA Women's World Cup tournaments; played 16 matches and scored 6 goals at those 3 global tournaments. Jennings-Gabarra with her teams won a gold medal at Atlanta, finished first at China 1991 and third at Sweden 1995.

International goals

Playing style 

Jennings-Gabarra is renowned for her remarkable ball control, imagination, dribbling skills and feints on the wing, as well as her ability to create chances out of nothing.  Her distinctive gait earned her the sobriquets "Crazy Legs" and "Gumby".

Also an effective goalscorer, she struck a 23-minute hat-trick against Germany to put the United States 3–0 ahead in the 1991 FIFA Women's World Cup semi-final.  The Los Angeles Times reported that "Carin Jennings, the ponytailed winger from Palos Verdes, tore the Germans to shreds".  In 1999 Assistant coach Lauren Gregg hailed Jennings-Gabarra's performance against Germany as the single greatest ever by an American player.

Jennings-Gabarra epitomizes the speed, fitness, and mental strength that coach Anson Dorrance demanded of his players.   "Before every game, Anson would challenge us, asking us which of us was going to make the difference. I always wanted to be that player."  Teammates saw Jennings-Gabarra as setting the standard for the group.

Coaching career 
Gabarra began coaching following her graduation from UCSB in 1987.  That year, Westmont College, located in Santa Barbara, California, hired her as its women’s soccer coach.  After one season, she moved to Harvard, where she was an assistant coach.  In 1993, the United States Naval Academy in Annapolis Maryland, hired Gabarra as its women’s soccer coach.  At the time the women’s team competed at the club level.  She developed it into a competitive Division I NCAA team.

In 2000, Gabarra was inducted into the National Soccer Hall of Fame.  In 2003, she was inducted into the U.S. Olympic Hall of Fame.

Personal life 
In 1992, Gabarra married U.S. men’s national team player Jim Gabarra.  They have two daughters and one son.  Gabarra is a member of the U.S. Soccer Athlete Advisory Council, the U.S. Olympic Committee Athlete Advisory Council and the Maryland Physical Fitness Council.

Honors 
World Cup Winner
 1991

Olympic Gold Medal
 1996

US National Amateur Cup
 1992, 1993

California Prep MVP
 1981, 1982, 1983

High School All American
 1980, 1981, 1982, 1983

NCAA Division I All American
 1984, 1985, 1986

FIFA World Cup Golden Ball
 1991

US Soccer Athlete of the Year
 1987, 1992

U.S. Olympic Player of the Year
 1987, 1992

National Soccer Medal of Honor
 2001

Hall of Fame
 National Soccer Hall of Fame
 U.S. Olympic Hall of Fame
 American Youth Soccer Organization Hall of Fame

References 

Match Reports

External links 
 National Soccer Hall of Fame profile
 US Naval Academy Coaching Profile

Living people
1965 births
American women's soccer coaches
Footballers at the 1996 Summer Olympics
National Soccer Hall of Fame members
Harvard Crimson women's soccer coaches
Olympic gold medalists for the United States in soccer
Sportspeople from East Orange, New Jersey
United States women's international soccer players
FIFA Century Club
1991 FIFA Women's World Cup players
1995 FIFA Women's World Cup players
UC Santa Barbara Gauchos women's soccer players
FIFA Women's World Cup-winning players
American women's soccer players
Medalists at the 1996 Summer Olympics
Women's association football forwards
Navy Midshipmen women's soccer coaches
Ajax America Women players